José Luis Garcés Rivera (born 9 May 1981) is a Panamanian footballer who currently plays for Liga Panameña de Futbol side San Francisco.

Club career
At club level, Garcés plays in the striker position. Nicknamed el Pistolero, he played for clubs in Brazil, Uruguay, Bulgaria, and Portugal before he returned to Panama because he was not being paid in his club Académica de Coimbra.

Criminal charges
He later signed a loan deal with Arabian club Al-Ittifaq but later returned to Panama to play for Árabe Unido, where he got arrested a couple of times and in April 2011 spent time in jail. He was later released in July 2011 and signed with San Francisco, making his return to football during the CONCACAF Champions League match against Seattle Sounders.

In July 2012 Garcés was again sentenced to serve time in jail on appeal for the alleged assault in 2011 on a woman who subsequently lost her baby, but in November 2012 he was again released after spending 5 months in prison. In March 2013 he was reportedly targeted by armed men in Puerto Caimito but came out unharmed.

In June 2014, Garcés joined Tauro, who released him in June 2015. He subsequently moved to Plaza Amador.

International career
Garcés made his international debut for the Panama national football team in 2000 in a match against Canada and has earned a total of 32 caps, scoring 9 goals. He represented his country in 10 FIFA World Cup qualification matches and played at the 2007 and 2009 CONCACAF Gold Cups.

His final international was a July 2009 CONCACAF Gold Cup match against the United States.

International goals
Scores and results list Panama's goal tally first.

Honors
Nacional
Uruguayan Primera División (1): 2005–06

CSKA Sofia
Bulgarian A Professional Football Group (1): 2007–08

National team
Gold Cup Runner-Up (1): 2005
UNCAF Nations Cup Runner-Up (1): 2007

References

External links

 

1981 births
Living people
People from La Chorrera District
Association football forwards
Panamanian footballers
Panama international footballers
2005 UNCAF Nations Cup players
2007 CONCACAF Gold Cup players
2009 CONCACAF Gold Cup players
Sporting San Miguelito players
C.D. Árabe Unido players
San Francisco F.C. players
Grêmio Foot-Ball Porto Alegrense players
Club Nacional de Football players
C.F. Os Belenenses players
PFC CSKA Sofia players
Associação Académica de Coimbra – O.A.F. players
Ettifaq FC players
Tauro F.C. players
C.D. Plaza Amador players
Panamanian expatriate footballers
Expatriate footballers in Brazil
Expatriate footballers in Uruguay
Expatriate footballers in Portugal
Expatriate footballers in Bulgaria
Panamanian expatriate sportspeople in Bulgaria
Expatriate footballers in Saudi Arabia
Uruguayan Primera División players
First Professional Football League (Bulgaria) players
Panamanian criminals
Saudi Professional League players
Liga Panameña de Fútbol players